Timothy McGee may refer to:
Timothy McGee, a fictional character on the television show NCIS
Tim McGee, professional football player in the American National Football League
Timothy McGee (USN), retired officer of the United States Navy